Arigo may refer to:

 John Arigo, Filipino-American basketball player
 Zé Arigó (1921–1971), Brazilian psychic surgeon
 Arigo (film), a 2000 film by Alan Arkin
 Arigo software, used by manufacturers, wholesalers and retailers for sourcing and product development.